Margit Stein (born 16 September 1966) is a German sports shooter. She competed at the 1988 Summer Olympics and the 1992 Summer Olympics.

References

External links
 

1966 births
Living people
German female sport shooters
Olympic shooters of Germany
Olympic shooters of West Germany
Shooters at the 1988 Summer Olympics
Shooters at the 1992 Summer Olympics
People from Altenkirchen (district)
Sportspeople from Rhineland-Palatinate
20th-century German women